Tom Gorman (born January 19, 1946) is a retired ATP tour American tennis player and coach. He won 7 singles and 9 doubles titles and reached semi-finals in the 3 of the 4 ATP tour grand slam events. His ATP ranking peaked at 8 in 1973.

Career

Gorman was ranked as high as world No. 8 (consensus) for the year 1973 and No. 10 on the ATP rankings (achieving that ranking on May 1 and June 3, 1974).

Gorman won seven singles titles in his career, the biggest coming in 1975 at Cincinnati. He also won nine doubles titles, including Paris in 1971, the same year he reached the French Open doubles final with Stan Smith. Gorman defeated Björn Borg to win the Stockholm Indoor event in 1973.

He reached the semifinal rounds in singles at Wimbledon (in 1971), the US Open (in 1972), and the French Open (in 1973); defeating Rod Laver, Jimmy Connors, and Jan Kodeš respectively. Gorman was a member of the winning U.S. Davis Cup team in 1972. As captain–coach, he led the U.S. Davis Cup team to victory in 1990 and 1992. Gorman holds the record for most match wins (18) by a U.S. Davis Cup captain and is the most current American to have won the Davis Cup as a player and a captain.

He was named coach of the Men's U.S Olympic Tennis teams in Seoul, South Korea and Barcelona, Spain. He guided the American doubles team of Ken Flach and Robert Seguso to a gold medal in the doubles competition in Seoul in 1988. In 2001, Gorman and his partner Jaime Fillol of Chile won the Super Masters Seniors at the US Open.

Gorman received praise for his sportsmanship during his 1972 Masters semifinal against Stan Smith in Barcelona. He had injured his back during the course of match, but opened up a 7–6, 6–7, 7–5, 5–4 40–30 lead and held a match point. Knowing that if he were to win the match he would be in no condition to play in the final against Ilie Năstase, he told the umpire that he could not continue and retired. This allowed Smith to instead play in the final, where he was beaten by Năstase in five sets.

He attended Seattle Preparatory School and was the Washington State high school tennis champion three years in a row. Gorman attended and graduated from Seattle University and was a two time All-American. He played in professional tour events in the 1960s, 1970s, and 1980s. For eight years, Gorman served as captain of the United States Davis Cup team, coaching some of America's greatest players and winning world championships in 1990 and '92. He oversaw American dream teams made up of tennis champions Andre Agassi, Michael Chang, Jim Courier, John McEnroe, and Pete Sampras, faced with the unenviable task of dealing with entourages and egos.

In November 2008, Gorman was named Director of Tennis at La Quinta Resort & Club and PGA WEST(TM) which he, along with other top American players including Arthur Ashe, Stan Smith, and Charlie Pasarell, help found in La Quinta, California. He retired from La Quinta in September 2015.

Gorman was appointed to the prestigious seven person International Tennis Federation Davis Cup Committee for a two-year term in 2012–14.

Family
Gorman and his wife Danni have two grown daughters, Hailey and KellyAnn, and they make their home in Sun Valley, Idaho.

Career finals

Singles (7 titles, 11 runner-ups)

Doubles (9 titles, 10 runner-ups)

References

External links
 
 
 

1946 births
Living people
American male tennis players
Sportspeople from Riverside County, California 
Seattle Redhawks men's tennis players
Tennis players from Seattle
People from La Quinta, California